Voom is a New Zealand band based in Auckland whose original lineup consisted of Buzz Moller, Danny Manetto and Mac Macaskill.

Background 
Formed in 1993, various tensions within the band caused Manetto and Macaskill to depart. Since the initial breakup, Macaskill and Manetto have worked together musically on numerous occasions producing music most recently in their Twenty Ten Project along with Simon Harris and Tony Shields (recording with Zero Studios, a recording studio owned by Manetto himself). Mac Macaskill died on 13 September 2012, leaving Manetto and Moller as the two surviving original members. The band has been a staple of Auckland campus radio for many years, and has had a number of student radio hits including "Beth", "Relax", and "Be Your Boy".

The current lineup of the band consists of Moller, Nick Buckton and Murray Fisher. They are currently signed to Auckland label Lil' Chief Records.

Discography

References

External links
Voom's MySpace page
Lil' Chief Records: Voom
Lil' Chief Records

New Zealand indie pop groups
Lil' Chief Records artists
People from Auckland
1993 establishments in New Zealand
Musical groups established in 1993
Musical groups from Auckland